Simpkinsville is a ghost town in Clermont County, in the U.S. state of Ohio. It was located in Stonelick Township.

History
Simpkinsville was named for David Simpkins, who started a cooper shop there in the 1820s.

References

Geography of Clermont County, Ohio
Ghost towns in Ohio